Marijuana EP is an EP released by Brujeria. The song "Marijuana" is the death metal parody of the pop hit "Macarena". Two vinyl versions exist - green and black. Early vinyl copies came with matches.

Track listing
"Marijuana" – 3:11
"Matando Güeros '97"– 3:13
"Pito Wilson (live)" * – 3:12
"Hechando Chingazos (live)" * – 3:41
"Matando Güeros (live)" * – 4:09
"Hidden Track" – 0:35
Live from the Whisky a Go Go. January 11, 1997.

Brujeria (band) albums
Live EPs
2000 EPs
2000 live albums
Albums recorded at the Whisky a Go Go